Christopher Robin is a 2018 American live-action/animated fantasy comedy-drama film directed by Marc Forster and written by Alex Ross Perry, Tom McCarthy, and Allison Schroeder, from a story by Greg Brooker and Mark Steven Johnson. The film is inspired by A. A. Milne and E. H. Shepard's Winnie-the-Pooh children's books and is a live-action/CGI follow-up of the Disney franchise of the same name. The film stars Ewan McGregor as the title character, alongside Hayley Atwell as his wife Evelyn, with the voices of Jim Cummings (reprising his roles as Winnie the Pooh and Tigger) and Brad Garrett (reprising his role as Eeyore). The story follows Christopher Robin, now an adult, who has lost his sense of imagination, only to be reunited with his childhood friend Winnie the Pooh, who he must escort back to the Hundred Acre Wood.

Plans of a live-action Winnie the Pooh adaptation were announced back in April 2015, and Forster was confirmed as the director in November 2016. McGregor signed on as Christopher Robin in April 2017 and principal photography began in August of that year in the United Kingdom, lasting until November.

Christopher Robin premiered in Burbank, California on July 30, 2018, and was released in the United States on August 3, 2018, by Walt Disney Studios Motion Pictures. The film grossed over $197 million worldwide, becoming the highest-grossing film in Disney's Winnie the Pooh franchise, surpassing The Tigger Movie (2000). The film received mostly positive reviews from critics, who praised its performances, musical score, and visual effects. The film received an Academy Award nomination for Best Visual Effects at the 91st Academy Awards.

Plot

Christopher Robin is leaving for boarding school, so his friends from the Hundred Acre Wood – Winnie the Pooh, Piglet, Eeyore, Tigger, Rabbit, Kanga, Roo and Owl – throw him a goodbye party. Christopher comforts Pooh and tells him that he will never forget him.

Christopher's rough experiences in boarding school and the sudden death of his father force him to mature quickly and he soon forgets the Hundred Acre Wood and his friends there. He grows up, marries architect Evelyn, has a daughter named Madeline and serves in the British Army during World War II. After the war, he works as Director of Efficiency at Winslow Luggages in London. He neglects his family due to his demanding job and plans to send Madeline to boarding school, just as he was. With the company hitting hard times, Christopher's superior, Giles Winslow Jr., tells him to decrease expenditures by 20%, largely by choosing which employees to lay off, and to present his plan on Monday. This causes Christopher to miss joining his family at their countryside cottage in Sussex for a summer-ending weekend.

When Pooh awakens the next morning and is unable to find his friends, he decides to travel through the door through which Christopher Robin was known to emerge, and finds himself in London. He reunites with Christopher, who is shocked to see Pooh, but takes him back to his London home. After a night and morning of chaos, Christopher escorts Pooh back to Sussex on the next train.

After sneaking past Christopher's cottage, the two enter the Hundred Acre Wood. Christopher becomes exasperated by Pooh's absent-mindedness and fear of Heffalumps and Woozles. Pooh, in trying to return Christopher's compass to him, trips into Christopher's briefcase and his papers spill onto the ground. Christopher lashes out at Pooh, declaring he is not a child anymore, before they are separated in the fog. He falls into a Heffalump trap, which is flooded by rainfall, soaking him and his belongings.

Christopher discovers Eeyore and Piglet, who lead him to the others, hiding in a log out of fear of a Heffalump (revealed to be the squeaking of a rusty weathercock from Owl's house after the wind made it fall from its tree while they were having tea). Unable to persuade his friends that he is truly Christopher Robin, he pretends to defeat the Heffalump to convince them. Having vanquished the Heffalump, Christopher finally convinces his friends that he is Christopher Robin, and they joyfully greet him. When they reunite with Pooh, Christopher apologizes for getting upset earlier and tells him how lost he feels. Pooh forgives him, reminding Christopher that they have found each other and comforts him with a hug. The next morning, Christopher rushes from the Hundred Acre Wood to make his presentation, after Tigger gives him his briefcase. On the way, he encounters his family, but much to Madeline's disappointment, he leaves for London.

Pooh discovers that Tigger removed Christopher's paperwork when drying his briefcase, so Pooh, Tigger, Piglet and Eeyore decide to return it. They meet Madeline, who recognizes them from her father's drawings. Madeline joins them, wanting to dissuade her father about boarding school, and they board a train to London. Evelyn follows after discovering a note Madeline left. At his presentation, Christopher discovers that his briefcase contains items from the Wood that Tigger had given him, including Eeyore's tail. Evelyn arrives and Christopher joins her to search for Madeline. Madeline's group stow away in crates, but Tigger, Eeyore and Piglet are accidentally thrown out, and they encounter Christopher and Evelyn in the process. Pooh and Madeline arrive near the Winslow building and reunite with Christopher and the others, but Madeline accidentally trips on some steps and loses all but one of the papers, upsetting her and Pooh. Christopher assures Madeline of her importance to him and tells her that he will not send her to boarding school.

Using the one paper Madeline saved, Christopher improvises a new plan involving reducing the prices of luggage, selling luggage to ordinary people to increase demand and giving employees paid leave. Winslow Jr. dismisses the idea, but Winslow Sr. warms to it and agrees to the plan. Winslow Jr. is humiliated when Christopher points out that he contributed nothing to the plan, having been out golfing all weekend.

Christopher, along with Pooh, Tigger, Eeyore and Piglet, finally takes his family into the Hundred Acre Wood to meet the rest of his friends. As everyone relaxes at a picnic, Pooh and Christopher Robin both share a tender moment together.

In a mid-credits scene, the employees of Winslow's are seen having fun at the beach while Richard M. Sherman performs "Busy Doing Nothing" on a piano. Pooh, Tigger, Piglet and Eeyore are relaxing on beach chairs with Eeyore saying "Thank you for noticing me".

Cast

 Ewan McGregor as Christopher Robin, a businessman working as an efficiency expert at Winslow Luggages who was once an imaginative boy. McGregor said that "[he] was very charmed by the script and the fact that they take Christopher Robin as a man [of his] age and that Winnie the Pooh comes back to him in a difficult time in his life. [McGregor found] it really moving", and said that "[Christopher] recognizes that he would like to be closer to [his daughter]", and said that "there was something of coming together as a father and a daughter" that appealed to him as a father of 4 daughters.  McGregor said that "[the actors' performances] wouldn't be nearly as effective, wouldn't feel as real and good, if it wasn't for [the voice cast]", as he has someone he can play opposite to. McGregor stated that "[he] really [likes] playing [Christopher Robin], and [he] really [felt] like [he] wanted to play" the character. Atwell said that McGregor's performance can let people see "the Man, but underneath [the audience] see the boy that he was". Director Marc Foster said that McGregor was "the perfect Christopher Robin", as he felt he "was able to capture [the] spirit that was needed to portray Christopher Robin as an adult person".
 Orton O'Brien as Young Christopher Robin.
 Hayley Atwell as Evelyn Robin, Christopher's wife who works as an architect. Foster said that "it was important for [him] to find" in Atwell "a very strong woman" that also is relatable and "can stand up for herself and doesn't play a victim or play into that because ultimately when [Christopher Robin denies his love to Evelyn], she's still a woman who believes in him, but also strong enough to stand up for herself". McGregor was happy when he was told that Hayley Atwell was also cast for the film, having previously worked together on Cassandra's Dream. Atwell said that the film's story is "a charming one, and a funny one, and ultimately a story about a man coming back to his family" which she felt will appeal audiences.
 Jim Cummings as the voices of:
 Winnie the Pooh, a honey-loving teddy bear who lives in the Hundred Acre Wood. Cummings has been the voice of Pooh since 1988. Atwell said that many of Pooh's lines were taken from A. A. Milne's original books, which she felt managed to capture "the wisdom of Pooh" who she said is "a bear of very little brain, but also a bear of very big heart". Kristen Burr felt that "They were so lucky to get Jim, as soon as the audience hear[s] him read his lines, a feeling of nostalgia washes over the audience and makes them smile".
 Tigger, a free-spirited and energetic toy tiger who lives in the Hundred Acre Wood who loves to bounce around on his tail like a spring. Cummings has been the regular voice of Tigger since 1999, and voiced the character many times as an understudy for Paul Winchell.
 Brad Garrett as the voice of Eeyore, a pessimistic toy donkey in the Hundred Acre Wood who always loses his tail and talks with a deep depressing voice and tone. Garrett previously voiced the character in video games Disney's Animated Storybook: Winnie the Pooh and the Honey Tree and Ready to Read with Pooh.
Christopher Robin also features the voices of Nick Mohammed, Peter Capaldi, Sophie Okonedo, Sara Sheen, and Toby Jones as Piglet, Rabbit, Kanga, Roo and Owl respectively. Bronte Carmichael as Madeline Robin, Christopher and Evelyn's daughter and Elsa Minell Solak as a 3-year-old Madeline Robin. Mark Gatiss as Giles Winslow Junior, Christopher's boss at Winslow Luggages.

Also appearing in the film are Oliver Ford Davies as Giles Winslow Senior, the father of Giles Winslow; Ronkẹ Adékoluẹjo as Katherine Dane; Adrian Scarborough as Hal Gallsworthy; Roger Ashton-Griffiths as Ralph Butterworth; Ken Nwosu as Paul Hastings; John Dagleish as Matthew Leadbetter; Amanda Lawrence as Joan MacMillan; Katy Carmichael as Daphne de Sélincourt and Paul Chahidi as Cecil Hungerford. Tristan Sturrock portrays Christopher Robin’s father and Matt Berry as a Policeman Bobby. Simon Farnaby appears as a Taxi driver; Mackenzie Crook as a Newspaper Seller and Clara McGregor as a Girl in Aircraft Office.

Production

Development
Initially in 2003, Brigham Taylor, inspired by the last chapter of The House at Pooh Corner, pitched to Disney an idea about a Winnie the Pooh film focusing on an adult Christopher Robin. However, due to other Pooh projects being in development at the time, the project was not pitched for a film. In 2015, Kristin Burr later convinced Taylor to resurrect the project, which the two then started working on that year.

On April 2, 2015, Walt Disney Pictures announced that a live-action adaptation based on the characters from the Winnie the Pooh franchise was in development, which would take a similar pattern to Alice in Wonderland (2010), Maleficent (2014), and Cinderella (2015). Alex Ross Perry was hired to write the script and Brigham Taylor hired to produce the film, about an adult Christopher Robin returning to the Hundred Acre Wood to spend time with Pooh and the gang. On November 18, 2016, it was reported that the studio had hired Marc Forster to direct the film, titled Christopher Robin, and the project would have "strong elements of magical realism as it seeks to tell an emotional journey with heartwarming adventure." On March 1, 2017, Tom McCarthy was hired to rewrite the existing screenplay.

Casting
On April 26, 2017, Ewan McGregor was announced to play the title character while Allison Schroeder was recruited to do additional work on the script. On June 22, 2017, it was revealed that Gemma Arterton had been in negotiations to portray the wife of the title character, but ultimately, she passed on the role. In August 2017, Hayley Atwell and Mark Gatiss were respectively cast as the title character's wife Evelyn and boss Giles Winslow. Nick Mohammed was cast as Piglet, while Jim Cummings was confirmed to be reprising his role as Winnie the Pooh, and Brad Garrett was revealed to be voicing Eeyore (he previously voiced the character in the Winnie the Pooh and the Honey Tree CD-ROM game). In January 2018, Peter Capaldi, Sophie Okonedo, and Toby Jones were cast as Rabbit, Kanga, and Owl, respectively. Chris O'Dowd was originally set to voice Tigger, with Roger L. Jackson voice-doubling for him, but he was replaced by Cummings, who has played the character partially from 1989 until fully since 2000, after audiences in test screenings reacted negatively towards how O'Dowd voiced the character.

Filming
Principal photography on the film began in early August 2017, in the United Kingdom, and concluded on November 4, 2017. Much of the filming of the Hundred Acre Wood scenes took place at Ashdown Forest, which was the original inspiration for the setting, as well as Windsor Great Park, at Shepperton Studios and at Dover seafront and the former  Station, now the town's cruise terminal which doubled as a London railway station. Filming also took place at Pinewood Studios.

Music
Jóhann Jóhannsson was hired to score the film, shortly before his death on February 9, 2018. The film is dedicated to his memory. Klaus Badelt was announced as taking over composing duties for Jóhannsson, but the score was ultimately written by Jon Brion and Geoff Zanelli, with additional music contributions by Zak McNeil, Bryce Jacobs, Paul Mounsey, and Philip Klein.

At an Academy event, songwriter and Disney Legend Richard M. Sherman revealed that the film would feature the iconic "Winnie the Pooh" theme, and that he was working on three new songs for the film, titled "Goodbye Farewell," "Busy Doing Nothing," and "Christopher Robin," with the first one being performed by the voice cast, and the last two by Sherman. Sherman said that he found "very special to be back at the Hundred Acre Wood" as "Winnie the Pooh became a dear friend of [his] when Walt gave [to the Sherman Brothers] the assignment to write songs for the first Winnie the Pooh short film," and felt the film has "a wonderful story." Sherman said that he wrote "Busy Doing Nothing" based on the fact that "[Pooh] is always busy. Doing nothing. And he's very proud of the fact he does nothing," and said "it was fun to write." He called the song "Christopher Robin" "a sweet, nostalgic, memory of a love song between Winnie the Pooh and Christopher [Robin]," and said the lyrics "are part of the storyline [of the film]."

"Up, Down and Touch the Ground" and "The Wonderful Thing About Tiggers," both written by Richard and his brother Robert B. Sherman and performed by Cummings as Pooh and Tigger, respectively, are also included in the film. The film's soundtrack, featuring Zanelli and Brion's score, and Sherman's new songs, was released on August 3, 2018.

Visual effects 
Visual effects studios Framestore and Method Studios, are leading the animation for the Hundred Acre Wood characters, with Overall Vfx Supervisor Chris Lawrence and Animation Supervisor Michael Eames leading the teams.

Release
Christopher Robin opened Burbank on July 30, 2018, and was released on August 3, 2018 by Walt Disney Studios Motion Pictures. The film was denied a release in China, as some have speculated it was due to Chinese netizens drawing comparisons between Winnie the Pooh and Chinese leader Xi Jinping since mid-2017. Other industry insiders speculated it was likely due to reasons such as the film's size and the presence of other Hollywood films in the market.

Novelization
A tie-in novelization of the film written by Elizabeth Rudnick was published by Disney Publishing Worldwide on July 3, 2018.

Home media
Christopher Robin was released on DVD and Blu-ray on November 6, 2018. The film debuted in second place behind Incredibles 2 on the NPD VideoScan First Alert chart for the week ending on November 11, 2018. The film became available to stream on Netflix USA and Canada on March 5, 2019, before being moved to Disney+ on September 5, 2020.

Reception

Box office
Christopher Robin grossed $99.2 million in the United States and Canada, and $98.4 million in other territories, for a total worldwide gross of $197.6 million.

In the United States and Canada, Christopher Robin was released alongside The Spy Who Dumped Me, The Darkest Minds, and Death of a Nation: Can We Save America a Second Time?. The film made $9.5 million on its first day, including $1.5 million from Thursday night previews. It went on to debut to $24.6 million, finishing second at the box office behind holdover Mission: Impossible – Fallout. The film fell 47% to $13 million in its second weekend, finishing third behind The Meg and Mission: Impossible – Fallout. The film finished sixth in its third through fifth weekends, grossing $8.9 million, $6.3 million, and $5.3 million, respectively.

Critical response
The website's critical consensus reads, "Christopher Robin may not equal A. A. Milne's stories – or their animated Disney adaptations – but it should prove sweet enough for audiences seeking a little childhood magic." On Metacritic, the film has a weighted average score of 60 out of 100, based on 43 critics, indicating "mixed or average reviews". Audiences polled by CinemaScore gave the film an average grade of "A" on an A+ to F scale, while PostTrak reported filmgoers gave it 4.5 out of 5 stars.

Ben Kenigsberg of The New York Times reviewed the film and said: "Once Christopher Robin softens its insufferable, needlessly cynical conception of the title character, it offers more or less what a Pooh reboot should: a lot of nostalgia, a bit of humor and tactile computer animation." And David Sims of The Atlantic wrote, "It's an odd, melancholic experience that at times recalls Terrence Malick as it does A. A. Milne, but there will certainly be some viewers in its exact wheelhouse." 

Michael Phillips of the Chicago Tribune gave the film three out of four stars and said, "Pooh's wisdom and kindness cannot be denied. The same impulses worked for the two Paddington movies, God knows. Christopher Robin isn't quite in their league, but it's affecting nonetheless." 

Richard Lawson of Vanity Fair gave the film a positive review and heavily praised the voice performance from Cummings, calling it "Oscar-worthy". Overall, he said, "As Winnie the Pooh (and Tigger too), the veteran voice actor gives such sweet, rumpled, affable life to the wistful bear of literary renown that it routinely breaks the heart. Cummings's performance understands something more keenly than the movie around it; he taps into a vein of humor and melancholy that is pitched at an exact frequency, one that will speak to child and adult alike. His Pooh is an agreeable nuisance and an accidental philosopher, delivering nonsensical (and yet entirely sensible) adages in a friendly, deliberate murmur ringed faintly with sadness. I wanted to (gently) yank him from the screen and take him home with me, his fuzzy little paw in mine as we ambled to the subway, the summer sun fading behind us. He's a good bear, this Pooh."

Conversely, Alonso Duralde of TheWrap called the film "slow and charmless" and wrote, "What we're left with is a Hook-style mid-life crisis movie aimed at kids, designed to shame parents who spend too much time at the office and not enough with their families." 

Helen O'Hara of Empire magazine gave the film two out of five stars and said, "Everyone's trying hard, but they can't quite live up to the particularly gentle, warm tone of Pooh himself. Unlike the bear of very little brain, this is a film pulled in different directions with entirely too many thoughts in its head".

The performance of Ewan McGregor as Christopher Robin was particularly well received. David Fear of Rolling Stone said, "He's an actor who can roll with this movie's punches, whether it requires him to be light on his feet or dragged down by existential despair, exhilarated by childlike play or exasperated by a house-wrecking creature who says things like, 'People say nothing is impossible, but I do nothing every day'." Adam Forsgren for East Idaho News wrote, "First and foremost is McGregor's performance in the title role. The guy sells being the put-upon, overburdened office drone so well that it's a treat to see him begin to rediscover his younger self and let himself play...McGregor is the glue that holds this whole movie together." Stephanie Zacharek of Time magazine stated, "But it's doubtful the movie would work at all if not for McGregor: He turns Christopher's anxiety into a haunting presence, the kind of storm cloud that we can all, now and then, feel hovering above us. Yet McGregor is also an actor capable of expressing unalloyed delight. And when, as Christopher Robin, he finally does, some of that delight rubs off on us too." 

Brian Lowry also noted in his review for CNN, "Give much of the credit to McGregor in the thankless task of playing opposite his adorably furry co-stars, ably handling the comedy derived from the fact that he doesn't dare let others see them." Odie Henderson of Rogerebert.com gave the film two out of four stars and said: "Christopher Robin can't reconcile its darkness and its light. But if these folks want to write an Eeyore movie that stays firmly planted in the Wood, I'll be first in line to see it." 

Simran Hans of The Guardian gave the film a two out of five stars, and noted, "Christopher's furry friends don't appear to be figments of his imagination. If they're not a metaphor for a misplaced sense of fun (or a midlife crisis), the film's tone ends up being weirdly adult for a kids' film."

Accolades

References

External links

  
 
 

2010s adventure comedy-drama films
2018 comedy-drama films
2010s fantasy comedy-drama films
American films with live action and animation
American adventure comedy-drama films
American children's adventure films
American children's fantasy films
American fantasy comedy-drama films
American World War II films
Censored films
Children's comedy-drama films
Live-action films based on Disney's animated films
Films about families
Films about friendship
Films about veterans
Films based on adaptations
Films based on children's books
Films based on multiple works
Films directed by Marc Forster
Puppet films
Films scored by Geoff Zanelli
Films scored by Jon Brion
Films set in the 1920s
Films set in the 1930s
Films set in the 1940s
Films set in country houses
Films set in forests
Films set in London
Films set in Sussex
Films shot at Shepperton Studios
Films shot in East Sussex
Films shot in Kent
Films set on trains
Magic realism films
Midlife crisis films
Films with screenplays by Mark Steven Johnson
Winnie-the-Pooh films
Walt Disney Pictures films
Works banned in China
Films shot at Pinewood Studios
2010s English-language films
2010s American films